Bikaner East Assembly constituency is one of the 200 constituencies of Rajasthan Legislative Assembly. The territory comes under Bikaner (Lok Sabha constituency) also.

Bikaner East Constituency covers all voters from parts of Bikaner tehsil, which include Bikaner Municipal Council wards, 5 to 13, 20, 22 to 28, 36 to 44 and 50 to 52, Patwar Circle Bikaner, Udairamsar, Gangashahar of ILRC Bikaner among others.

Members of the Legislative Assembly

References

See also 
 Member of the Legislative Assembly (India)

Bikaner district
Assembly constituencies of Rajasthan